Sheekey is a surname. Notable people with the surname include:

 James Sheekey (born 1994), Welsh rugby union player
 Kevin Sheekey (born 1966), American businessman and political adviser

See also
 Sheskey